Philippe Le Jeune (born 15 June 1960) is a Belgian former equestrian. He competed in two events at the 2012 Summer Olympics.

References

External links
 

1960 births
Living people
Belgian male equestrians
Olympic equestrians of Belgium
Equestrians at the 2012 Summer Olympics
People from Uccle
Sportspeople from Brussels
21st-century Belgian people